In quantum computing, classical shadow is a protocol for predicting functions of a quantum state using only a logarithmic number of measurements. Classical shadow is useful for direct fidelity estimation, entanglement verification, estimating correlation functions, and predicting entanglement entropy.

Recently, researchers have built on classical shadow to devise provably efficient classical machine learning algorithms for a wide range of quantum many-body problems. For example, machine learning models could learn to solve ground states of quantum many-body systems and classify quantum phases of matter.

Inputs   copies of an unknown -qubit state 
                  A list of unitaries  that is tomographically complete

                  A classical description of a quantum channel 
 Choose a random unitary  from 
 Classically compute  and add it to a list 
Return 

Inputs A list of observables 
                  A classical shadow 

Return A list  where 
 where  and where .

References 

Quantum information science
Quantum information theory
Quantum measurement
Quantum computing